The State Museum of Political History of Russia (known as the State Museum of Revolution before August 1991) is a historical and political museum located in Saint Petersburg. The stated purpose of the museum is to archive and showcase the political history of the Russian Federation.

Exhibits
The museum houses artifacts owned by key figures in the history of Russia, such as the belongings of politicians, statesmen, scientists, and military leaders, among them Sergei Witte, Nicholas II, Vladimir Lenin, Mikhail Gorbachev, and Yuri Gagarin.A calendar of exhibitions is available online.

See also
List of museums in Saint Petersburg

References

External links

 Official web page: The State Museum of the Russian Political History
 "RussianMuseums", Museum Of Political History, Sept 30, 2012 
 "POLITHISTORY.RU", Museum Political History's Event Calendar, Oct 4, 2012

History museums in Saint Petersburg